was a Japanese samurai retainer of the Hosokawa clan and student of kokugaku. Early surviving sources record the spelling of his surname in man'yō style as (加々見) or (加々美).

Biography
Little record has been preserved of Kagami's early life, but he is known to have been born in the vicinity of the Kumamoto Domain. At some point, he became a subordinate of the domainal vassal .

Before 1867, he entered into the tutelage of the kokugaku scholar Hayashi Ōen and became a devout disciple of Ōen's Shinto theology. Subjects of his studies included gagaku as well as kagura, and he is said to have excelled in the performance of ancient music.

Kagami was an early member of this organization. Angered by the new central government's reversal on its nativist promises in the aftermath of the Boshin War, the Keishintō formulated a plan to seize the local garrison at Kumamoto in preparation for a march on the capital while the majority of the government forces stationed there were occupied by the Saga Rebellion.

On the night of October 24, 1876, Kagami participated in the Keishintō's assault on Kumamoto Castle, and led the attack against the campsite of the regimental artillerymen. The uprising was repelled, and Kagami retreated with a small unit into the nearby mountains. Among the survivors, he was a particularly vocal advocate for a renewed offensive and suggested acquiring funds for escape and rearmament from his former master Mibuchi Eijirō. When this proved impossible due to a widespread police crackdown, Kagami joined several other survivors near the peak of Omigatake mountain, overlooking the castle, in preparation for seppuku. So that the 26-year-old kaishakunin  would not be left to die alone, Kagami waited until the others had been decapitated and committed suicide alongside Tashiro.

His jisei was recovered from the site of his death, and was collected in a 1944 anthology by Araki Seishi.

References 

1836 births
1876 deaths
Samurai
Kokugaku scholars
19th-century Japanese male musicians
Japanese swordfighters
Suicides by sharp instrument in Japan
Japanese Shintoists
Japanese nationalists
Japanese rebels
People from Kumamoto Prefecture